Felix von Niemeyer (31 December 1820 – 14 March 1871) was a German internist born in Magdeburg. He was the grandson of theologian August Hermann Niemeyer (1754–1828).

Biography

He studied medicine at the University of Halle and in 1844 started work as a physician in Magdeburg. Later, he was a professor of internal medicine at the University of Greifswald (from 1855), and at the University of Tübingen (from 1860). During the Franco-Prussian War, he served as a medical consultant.

Niemeyer is largely remembered for his written works, in particular, the Lehrbuch der speziellen Pathologie, a textbook that was published in eleven editions up until 1884, and was translated into seven languages. He is also known for espousing a high-protein, low-carbohydrate diet  that was in essence a modification of the popular "Banting diet", a regimen endorsed by William Banting (1796–1878), an English undertaker.

In 1848 he was co-founder of the Medizinische Gesellschaft zu Magdeburg (Medical Society of Magdeburg). In 1865 he became a consulting physician to King Charles I of Württemberg, and in 1870, he was elected a foreign member of the Royal Swedish Academy of Sciences.

Partial list of works 
 Die asiatische Cholera, ein primär-örtliches Leiden der Darmschleimhaut, in: Die medicinische Reform. Eine Wochenschrift 1, Nr. 19, 1848, 134–138 (Asiatic cholera, a primary local disease of the intestinal mucosa). 
 Die symptomatische Behandlung der Cholera mit besonderer Rücksicht auf die Bedeutung des Darmleidens, 1849 (Symptomatic treatment of cholera with special attention given to intestinal disease).
 Klinische Mittheilungen aus dem Städtischen Krankenhause zu Magdeburg, 1855 (Clinical communications from the municipal hospital of Magdeburg).
 Lehrbuch der speciellen Pathologie und Therapie mit besonderer Rücksicht auf Physiologie und pathologische Anatomie, 1858 (Textbook of special pathology and therapy with special reference given to pathological anatomy and physiology).
The Treatment of Corpulence, by the So-Called Banting System (1865)

References
 This article incorporates text based on a translation of an equivalent article at the German Wikipedia.

External links
 
  Essay about William Banting's Diet

1820 births
1871 deaths
German internists
Low-carbohydrate diet advocates
Members of the Royal Swedish Academy of Sciences
Physicians from Magdeburg
Academic staff of the University of Greifswald
Academic staff of the University of Tübingen